Syed Mohammad Habibul Haque is a Bangladesh Nationalist Party politician and the former Member of Parliament of Comilla-17.

Early life and education
Haque was born to a Bengali Muslim family of aristocratic Nawabs from Laksam in Comilla District, Bengal Presidency. The family were Syeds, claiming descent from Ali, the fourth Caliph of Islam. Haque studied law, and became a qualified barrister.

Career
Haque was elected to the 3rd National Assembly of Pakistan in 1962, representing the Comilla-VI (Laksam) constituency. In 1979, he was elected to the second Jatiya Sangsad as a Bangladesh Nationalist Party candidate from the Comilla-17 constituency. Haque died during this tenure.

References

Bangladesh Nationalist Party politicians
Bangladeshi people of Arab descent
2nd Jatiya Sangsad members
Pakistani MNAs 1965–1969
Year of birth missing
1979 deaths
People from Comilla District